Dieter Oesterhelt (10 November 1940 – 28 November 2022) was a German biochemist. From 1980 until 2008, he was director of the Max Planck Institute for Biochemistry, Martinsried.

Biography
Oesterhelt studied chemistry at the University of Munich from 1959 to 1963. From 1964 to 1967 he worked at the Institute of Biochemistry at the same university under Feodor Lynen. He was then a research assistant at the Max Planck Institute for Cell Chemistry until 1969. From 1969 to 1973 he worked as an academic adviser at the Institute for Biochemistry at the University of Munich and carried out work on the structure, function and biosynthesis of the purple membrane of Halobacterium salinarum. In 1975 he became a junior research group leader at the Friedrich Miescher Laboratory in Tübingen. From 1976 to 1979 he was a full professor at the University of Würzburg. Oesterhelt has been a member of the Max Planck Society and director of the Max Planck Institute for Biochemistry, Martinsried, since 1980. He retired in 2008.

In 1969, Oesterhelt went to the University of California at San Francisco, where he joined the lab of Walther Stoeckenius to study the cell membrane of Halobacterium salinarum. He proved that retinaldehyde was contained in a protein of the so-called "purple membrane" of Halobacterium. This protein was isolated and called bacteriorhodopsin. After returned to Germany, Oesterhelt showed that  physiological function of bacteriorhodopsin is to pump protons out of the cell. Members of his department at the Max Planck Institute for Biochemistry researched the structure-function relationships of membrane proteins and other microbial rhodopsins such as halorhodopsin, which later became a molecular tool in optogenetics. In 2021 he received the Albert Lasker Award for Basic Medical Research.

Oesterhelt died on 28 November 2022, at the age of 82.

Honors and awards 

 Member of the Deutschen Akademie der Technikwissenschaften (acatech)
 1983: Liebig Medal
 1989: Member of the Academy of Sciences Leopoldina and the Academia Europaea
 1990: Karl Heinz Beckurts-Preis
 1991: Otto Warburg Medal
 1991: Corresponding Member  of the Nordrhein-Westfälischen Akademie der Wissenschaften und der Künste
 1993: Gregor-Mendel-Medal of the Deutschen Akademie der Naturforscher Leopoldina
 1998: Alfried-Krupp-Wissenschaftspreis
 2000: Werner von Siemens Ring
 2002: Paul-Karrer-Lecture and Medal
 2004: Officer's Cross of the Order of Merit of the Federal Republic of Germany
 2011: Wissenschaftspreis: Forschung zwischen Grundlagen und Anwendungen
 2016: Bayerischer Maximiliansorden für Wissenschaft und Kunst
 2021: Albert Lasker Award for Basic Medical Research

References

Further reading 
 Christina Beck: Single-celled organisms shed light on neurobiology, in: MaxPlanckForschung 4/2014, p. 19–25.
 
 

1940 births
2022 deaths
Werner von Siemens Ring laureates
Officers Crosses of the Order of Merit of the Federal Republic of Germany
Members of the Bavarian Academy of Sciences
Members of the Göttingen Academy of Sciences and Humanities
Corresponding Members of the Austrian Academy of Sciences
Members of Academia Europaea
Max Planck Society people
Recipients of the Albert Lasker Award for Basic Medical Research
Academic staff of Max Planck Society
Academic staff of the University of Würzburg
Scientists from Munich
Max Planck Institute directors